Glyn Davies (31 May 1932 – 7 February 2013) was a Welsh professional footballer who made 217 appearances in the Football League playing as a defender for Derby County and Swansea Town. Davies then became player-manager of Southern League side Yeovil Town, before in 1965 he was appointed Swansea Town manager,  with Yeovil receiving a fee in the region of £1,250 as compensation.

After his spell as manager for Swansea City, he was player-coach at Pembroke Borough.

References

1932 births
2013 deaths
Footballers from Swansea
Welsh footballers
Welsh football managers
Association football defenders
Derby County F.C. players
Swansea City A.F.C. players
Yeovil Town F.C. players
English Football League players
Yeovil Town F.C. managers
Swansea City A.F.C. managers
English Football League managers
Pembroke Borough A.F.C. players